Lauretta Jean's is a bakery and pie shop with two locations in Portland, Oregon.

Description 
Lauretta Jean's is a bakery with locations in downtown and southeast Portland. Martin Cizmar of Willamette Week described the southeast Portland location as "classy but casual, laid out like a coffee shop with low light, a simple wood-and-glass counter and a poster advocating weed". The menu has included pies, breakfast pastries such as apricot almond scones and biscuits with jam and butter, cookies, and breakfast sandwiches. The lunch menu has included quiches, salads, soups, and pies with ham and cheese, caramelized onion, and blue cheese. Pies are sold whole or by the slice; varieties have included chocolate cream, heirloom apple and bourbon pecan, honey hazelnut, blackberry and raspberry streusel, key lime, and sweet potato marshmallow meringue. Coffee drinks and alcoholic beverages are also served.

History 

Baker and owner Kate McMillen began operating the business from a stall at the Portland Farmers Market. In 2011, she relocated Lauretta Jean's to a small brick and mortar shop on Southwest Pine Street in downtown's Transit Mall, operating primarily via take-out and sharing the space with Cafe Velo. McMillen opened a second shop on Division Street in southeast Portland's Richmond neighborhood in 2012, filling the space previously occupied by Pix Pâtisserie. The second shop offered an expanded menu and indoor seating for patrons. She created separate pickup and take-out windows for the shop during the COVID-19 pandemic.

Reception 
In 2013, Martin Cizmar of Willamette Week called Lauretta Jean's "a perfect pie shop". The newspaper's readers ranked the business third in the Best Dessert House category and first in the Best Pie category in the 2017 annual "Best of Portland" readers' poll. In 2016, readers of The Oregonian ranked Lauretta Jean's one of Portland's ten best pie shops. The newspaper's Samantha Bakall also included the bakery in 2017 list of the city's best dessert spots for Valentine's Day.

Michelle Lopez included Lauretta Jean's in Eater Portland's 2018 list of "15 Portland Biscuits That Would Make Any Southerner Proud", and Nick Townsend included the bakery in the website's 2020 list of 15 restaurants "worth visiting" on Southeast Division Street. The website's 2021 overview of "Where to Find Legit Pies in Portland" said Lauretta Jean's is "easily one of the city's top three pie shops" and complimented McMillen, who "particularly shines with her cream pies, as well as the standout salted honey pie". Thrillist included Lauretta Jean's in a 2021 list of the 25 best pie shops in the United States.

See also

 List of bakeries

References

External links 

 
 Lauretta Jean's at the Food Network
 Lauretta Jean's at Zomato
 Kohr Explores: Grab a slice or two of Lauretta Jean’s pie by Kohr Harlan (January 21, 2022), KOIN

Bakeries of Oregon
Restaurants in Portland, Oregon
Richmond, Portland, Oregon
Southwest Portland, Oregon